Alfred Ruish (November 10, 1933 – February 15, 2009) was a Canadian football player who played for the Hamilton Tiger-Cats. He won the Grey Cup with Hamilton in 1953. He previously played football at Stamford Collegiate in Niagara Falls. He is a member of the Niagara Sports Wall of Fame.

He also competed in track and field, setting Canadian records in the shot put and discus throw. He won the shot put title at the Canadian Track and Field Championships in 1952.

References

1933 births
2009 deaths
Players of Canadian football from Ontario
Sportspeople from Niagara Falls, Ontario
Track and field athletes from Ontario
Canadian male shot putters
Canadian male discus throwers
Canadian Track and Field Championships winners
Hamilton Tiger-Cats players